Pioneer is an unincorporated community in Barry County, Missouri, United States.

History
A post office called Pioneer was established in 1883, and remained in operation until 1934. The community was named for the local pioneer settlers.

References

Unincorporated communities in Barry County, Missouri
Unincorporated communities in Missouri